The Emil and Patricia Jones Convocation Center, also known as the Jones Convocation Center or simply the JCC, is a 7,000-seat multi-purpose arena in Chicago, Illinois. Completed in 2007, the arena is home court for the Chicago State University Cougars men's and women's basketball teams.  The arena replaced the Dickens Athletic Center, which only had capacity to seat 2,500 persons.

The convocation center is unique among Illinois university athletic projects, as Chicago State University itself did not need to raise any money for the project; the money was allocated from the State of Illinois Treasury by then Senate President Emil Jones.

The venue hosted the 2012 and 2013 Great West Conference men's basketball tournament.

See also
 List of NCAA Division I basketball arenas

References

External links

 Jones Convocation Center — official site
 "Problems and Discontent Bedevil Chicago State": November 29, 2009 Chicago News Cooperative for The New York Times.

Sports venues completed in 2007
Basketball venues in Chicago
College basketball venues in the United States
Chicago State Cougars men's basketball
2007 establishments in Illinois